Marin Draganja and Mate Pavić won the title, defeating Sanchai and Sonchat Ratiwatana in the final, 6–3, 3–6, [10–7].

Seeds

Draw

Draw

References
 Main Draw

Eskisehir Cup - Doubles
2013 Doubles